Madeline Matzen (sometimes credited as M. Matzene) was an American screenwriter who worked in Hollywood on silent films of the 1910s and 1920s.

Biography 
Matzen was born in Munich, Germany, to Herman Matzen and Emma Hale. Her father was from Germany, and her mother was born in Ohio. Her mother died when she was young, and, she was raised in Ohio by her father and her stepmother. By the 1910s, she had moved to Hollywood to pursue a career as an actress. She and her sister, Dorothy, both ended up finding work at studios as scenarists, according to census records. Madeline wrote a string of films during the late 1910s through the late 1920s.

Selected filmography 
As writer:

 Bulldog Pluck (1927)
 The Fighting Hombre (1927)
 Heart o' the Hills (1919)
 In Wrong (1919)
 Burglar by Proxy (1919)
 Bill Apperson's Boy (1919)

References 

Film people from Munich
1889 births
1947 deaths
German women screenwriters
20th-century German screenwriters
German emigrants to the United States